Van Dormael is a surname. Notable people with the surname include:

Jaco Van Dormael (born 1957), Belgian film director, screenwriter, and playwright
Juliette Van Dormael (born 1990), Belgian cinematographer
Pierre Van Dormael (1952–2008), Belgian jazz guitarist and composer

Surnames of Dutch origin